Teritip is a subdistrict in the East Balikpapan, Balikpapan.

Tourisms
 Teritip Crocodile Breeding Zoo (Penangkaran Buaya Teritip)
 Serumpun Beach (Pantai Serumpun)
 Surya Hill Recreational Park (Taman Rekreasi Bukit Surya)
 Mangrove Forest Hall Barnacle Conservation (Hutan Manggrove Pendopo)

References

External links
 Teritip subdistrict official website (in Indonesia)

Balikpapan